Dutse International Airport  is an airport serving the city of Dutse in Jigawa State, northern Nigeria.

Airlines and destinations

See also
Transport in Nigeria
List of airports in Nigeria

References

External links
OurAirports - Dutse Airport

Airports in Nigeria